Lena Niang (born 20 September 1996) is a Senegalese basketball player for Temple Owls and the Senegalese national team.

She represented Senegal at the 2019 Women's Afrobasket.

References

1996 births
Living people
Centers (basketball)
People from Bowie, Maryland
Senegalese women's basketball players
21st-century American women